The 2006 World Thoroughbred Racehorse Rankings is the 2006 edition of the World Thoroughbred Racehorse Rankings. It is an assessment of racehorses which was issued by the International Federation of Horseracing Authorities (IFHA) in January 2007. It includes horses aged three or older which raced or were trained during 2006 in countries where the flat racing year runs from January 1 to December 31. These countries are generally in the Northern Hemisphere.

The ratings represent a weight value in pounds, with higher values given to horses which showed greater ability. It is judged that these weights would equalize the abilities of the horses if carried in a theoretical handicap race. The list includes all horses rated 115 or above, and it also shows the surface and the distances at which the rating was achieved.

The highest rating in the 2006 season was 129, which was given to the performance of Invasor in the Breeders' Cup Classic. In total, 180 horses were included in the list, 32 more than in the 2005 Rankings.

Full rankings for 2006
 Country foaled – Horse names are followed by a suffix indicating the country where foaled.
 Age – The ages shown for horses foaled in the Northern Hemisphere are as of their universal date of increase, January 1, 2006. The ages of horses born in the Southern Hemisphere are taken from their equivalent date, August 1, 2006.
 Sex – The following abbreviations are used:
 C – Colt – Ungelded male horse up to four-years-old.
 F – Filly – Female horse up to four-years-old.
 H – Horse – Ungelded male horse over four-years-old.
 M – Mare – Female horse over four-years-old.
 G – Gelding – Gelded male horse of any age.

Certain horses may have also recorded a lesser rating over a distance different from that listed above. The IFHA publishes this information when the lower rating represents the overall top performance in a particular category. There was one such additional rating for this season:

Top ranked horses
The tables below show the top ranked horses overall, the top fillies and mares, and the top three-year-olds in the 2006 Rankings. They also show the top performers in various subdivisions of each group, which are defined by the distances of races, and the surfaces on which they are run. The IFHA recognizes five distance categories — Sprint, Mile, Intermediate, Long and Extended — identified by the acronym "SMILE". These are framed as follows:

 Sprint: 1,000–1,300m (1,000–1,599m for races in Canada and the United States)
 Mile: 1,301–1,899m (1,600–1,899m for races in Canada and the United States)
 Intermediate: 1,900–2,100m
 Long: 2,101–2,700m
 Extended: 2,701m +

References
 IFHA 2006 World Thoroughbred Racehorse Rankings
 IFHA 2006 Press Release
 guardian.co.uk
 mirror.co.uk
 thoroughbredtimes.com

World Thoroughbred Racehorse Rankings
World Thoroughbred Racehorse Rankings 2006